The Lacquered Box (French: Le coffret de laque) is a 1932 French crime film directed by Jean Kemm and starring Danielle Darrieux. It was based on Agatha Christie's play Black Coffee which had been turned into a British film the previous year.

Plot summary

Cast
In alphabetical order
 René Alexandre 
 Harry Arbell 
 Danielle Darrieux as Henriette Stenay  
 Maxime Desjardins 
 Gaston Dupray 
 Alice Field 
 Maurice Varny 
 Marcel Vibert

References

Bibliography 
 Philippe Rège. Encyclopedia of French Film Directors, Volume 1. Scarecrow Press, 2009.

External links 
 
 

1932 crime films
French crime films
1932 films
Films directed by Jean Kemm
French films based on plays
Films based on Hercule Poirot books
French multilingual films
French black-and-white films
1932 multilingual films
1930s French-language films
1930s French films